French football club SC Bastia's 2006–07 season. Finished 9th place in league. Top scorer of the season, including 10 goals in 9 league matches have been Pierre-Yves André. Was eliminated to Coupe de France end of 64, the Coupe de la Ligue was able to be among the 2. tour.

Transfers

In 
Summer
 Frédéric Mendy from St. Etienne
 Franco Dolci and Florian Jarjat from Nice
 Christophe Gaffory from Bastia B
 Damien Bridonneau from Guingamp
 Mehdi Méniri from Metz
 Austin Ejide from Etoile du Sahel

Winter
 Alexandre Licata from AS Monaco

Out 
Summer
 Paul Essola to Stal Alchevsk
 Fabrice Jau to Sedan
 David Sauget to Nancy
 Bernt Haas to Köln
 Nicolas Penneteau to Valenciennes
 Price Jolibois to free
 Mounir Diane to Lens
 Franck Matingou to free

Winter
 Pascal Camadini to Strasbourg
 Florian Jarjat to Dijon
 Alexandre Licata to Gueugnon
 Christophe Meslin to Guingamp

Squad

Ligue 2

League table

Results summary

Results by round

Matches

Coupe de France

Coupe de la Ligue

Statistics

Top scorers

League top assists

References 

SC Bastia seasons
Bastia